Cabatuan is the name of three places in the Philippines:

 Cabatuan, Iloilo
 Cabatuan, Isabela
 Cabatuan, Palapag